Little Seal Dog Island (also known as West Seal Dog Island) is an uninhabited islet of the British Virgin Islands in the Caribbean.  It is located in a smaller sub-group of islands referred to as the Dog Islands, or more commonly, "The Dogs".  Other islets in The Dogs include Great Dog, East Seal Dog and George Dog, all of which are to the northwest of Virgin Gorda.

Dog Islands